Baliar Khurd is a village in Rewari district situated on Rewari-Delhi road after Hansaka villageKhurd and Kalan Persian language word which means small and Big respectively when two villages have same name then it is distinguished as Kalan means Big and Khurd means Small with Village Name.
 in Haryana, India.

References 

Villages in Rewari district